Le Haut-Saint-François (The Upper Saint-François [St. Francis]) is a regional county municipality in southeastern Quebec, Canada in the Estrie region. Its seat is in Cookshire-Eaton, and it is named for the Saint-François River which runs through the RCM.

Subdivisions
There are 14 subdivisions within the RCM:

Cities & towns (3)
 Cookshire-Eaton
 East Angus
 Scotstown

Municipalities (8)
 Ascot Corner
 Bury
 Chartierville
 Dudswell
 La Patrie
 Newport
 Saint-Isidore-de-Clifton
 Weedon

Townships (3)
 Hampden
 Lingwick
 Westbury

Demographics
Mother tongue data, from Canada 2016 Census:

Transportation

Access routes
Highways and numbered routes that run through the municipality, including external routes that start or finish at the county border:

 Autoroutes
 None

 Principal highways
 
 
 

 Secondary highways
 
 
 
 
 
 
 

 External routes

See also
 List of regional county municipalities and equivalent territories in Quebec

References